The Unitech Cup 2006 was 3 match bilateral One-Day cricket contest between home team Sri Lanka and India. The Unitech Cup was originally a Triangular One-Day Cricket Tournament to be held in Sri Lanka, between Sri Lanka, India and South Africa. However, South Africa pulled out due to safety issues regarding a nearby bomb blast in Colombo, not far from the stadium. The tournaments fixtures were to be held originally in the cities of Dambulla and Colombo, but were later revised to be played only in Colombo. Each team was to play 4 matches, 2 against each opponent, with the best 2 teams qualifying for the final. Despite statistics pointing out Sri Lanka to be favourites at home, the series was tipped to be one of the most competitive tournaments in a while. This was despite many key injuries in the South African squad.

Squads

Safety issues 
On the eve of the tournament, the opening match, between Sri Lanka and South Africa, on 14 August 2006, was called off due to torrential rain. With reserve days for each scheduled match, this was not a major issue, but a bomb blast that occurred only 2 kilometres away from the stadium endangered the tournament. This was due to increased concerns from the South African players, who were ready to pull out, but were willing to continue playing if Security Evaluations deemed it safe. An official statement from the South African Cricket Board was made, stating that the team would pull out, due to the current risk being at an "unacceptable level".

The Sri Lankan board persuaded the Board of Cricket Control of India to consider a 5-match Bilateral series, but the BCCI accepted a 3-match series.

A revised fixtures list was released after the considerable delay and the decision made by the South Africans.

League stage

Postponed match

1st match

2nd match

3rd match

4th match

5th match

6th match

Rescheduled ODI series between Sri Lanka and India

External links 
 Cricinfo - Triseries in Sri Lanka 2006 - http://aus.cricinfo.com/db/ARCHIVE/2006/OD_TOURNEYS/UNITECHC/

References 

International cricket competitions in 2006